Jeffrey Kallberg (born 17 October 1954) is an American musicologist, who specializes 19th and 20th-century classical music, as well as topics in critical theory and gender studies related to music. He has written numerous articles and studies the life and works of the composer Frédéric Chopin, who is the subject of much of his research.

Life and career
Jeffrey Kallberg was born on 17 October 1954 in Glencoe, Minnesota, US. He received a Bachelor of Arts at the University of California, Los Angeles in 1975 and Master of Arts at the University of Chicago in 1978. Since 1982, Kallberg has been on the faculty of the University of Pennsylvania, where be became an associate professor in 1987. Throughout his career he has held visiting professorships at the State University of New York, Harvard University and Princeton University.

Kallberg's research includes 19th and 20th-century classical music, as well as topics relating to critical theory and gender studies in music. In particular, he has written much on the composer and pianist Frédéric Chopin, included analysis of his life and works based on "style, formal structure, publication history and gender and ideological issues". In 2002, Kallberg published a realization of a fragmented and somewhat illegible prelude by Chopin, labeled Prelude No. 27, "Devil's Trill".

Kallberg is coeditor with Anthony Newcomb of the 'New Perspectives in Music History and Criticism' monograph series. He edited a critical edition of Verdi's Luisa Miller in 1991.

Selected bibliography

References

Living people
1954 births
20th-century American musicologists
21st-century American musicologists
Chopin scholars